Ray Sings, Basie Swings is an album that mixes previously unreleased Ray Charles vocal performances from 1973 with newly recorded instrumental tracks by the contemporary Count Basie Orchestra.

Track listing
 "Oh, What a Beautiful Morning" (Oscar Hammerstein, Richard Rodgers) – 4:35
"Let the Good Times Roll" (Sam Theard, Fleecie Moore) – 2:57
 "How Long Has This Been Going On?" (George Gershwin, Ira Gershwin) – 6:19
 "Every Saturday Night" (Jerry West, Silas Hogan) – 4:05
 "Busted" (Harlan Howard) – 2:35
 "Crying Time" (Buck Owens) – 3:53
 "I Can't Stop Loving You" (Don Gibson) – 4:02
 "Come Live with Me" (Felice Bryant, Boudleaux Bryant) – 4:10
 "Feel So Bad" (James Johnson, Leslie Temple) – 4:10
 "The Long and Winding Road" (John Lennon, Paul McCartney) – 4:04
 "Look What They've Done to My Song (Melanie Safka) – 2:51
 "Georgia on My Mind" (Hoagy Carmichael, Stuart Gorrell) – 4:40

Source:

Personnel
 Ray Charles – vocals, piano 
Directed by Bill Hughes
 Marshall McDonald – Lead alto saxophone, flute
 Grant Langford – 2nd alto saxophone
Doug Lawrence – 1st tenor saxophone
 Doug Miller – 2nd tenor saxophone
 John Williams – baritone saxophone
 Dave Keim – Lead trombone
 Clarence Banks – 2nd trombone
Alvin Walker - 3rd trombone
 Barry Cooper – bass trombone
Mike Williams - Lead trumpet 
Scotty Barnhart – 2nd trumpet
 Shawn Edmonds – 3rd trumpet
 Endré Rice – 4th trumpet
 Joey DeFrancesco – organ
 Tony Suggs – piano
 James Leary – double bass
 Will Matthews – guitar
 Butch Miles – drums

Backing vocals
 Patti Austin
 Maxi Anderson
 Lynne Fiddmont
 Lorraine Perry
 Sharon Perry
 Darlene Perry
 Valerie Pinkston
 Sandy Simmons

Additional musicians
 Wayne Bergeron
 Chuck Berghofer
 Jim Cox
 John Chiodini
 Andy Martin

Technical
 Quincy Jones – arranger
 John Clayton – arranger
 Roger Neumann – arranger
 Larry Muhoberac – arranger
 Shelly Berg – arranger, conductor, musician
 Tom Scott – arranger, conductor
 Bill Hughes – orchestra director
 Aaron Woodward – executive producer
 Bill Airey Smith – engineer
 Bill McKinney – assistant engineer
 Charles Paakkari – engineer
 Doug Sax – mastering
 Don Murray – engineer, mixing
 Eric Weaver – assistant engineer
 Gregg Field – conductor, engineer, producer, vocal arrangement
 Joe Adams – executive producer, producer
 Joe Brown – assistant engineer
 John Burk – executive producer, producer
 Paul "Scooby" Smith – assistant engineer
 Paul Hamann – assistant engineer
 Sanwook Nam – mastering
 Seth Presant – engineer
 Steve Genewick – engineer

Source:

References

Ray Charles compilation albums
Jazz albums by American artists
Ray Charles live albums
2006 compilation albums
2006 live albums
Albums arranged by Quincy Jones
Albums arranged by Larry Muhoberac
Count Basie Orchestra live albums
Hear Music compilation albums
Hear Music live albums